Jesús Suárez may refer to:

 Jesús Suárez (skier) (1912–1997), Spanish cross-country skier
 Jesús Suárez Cueva (born 1955), Spanish racing cyclist